Wrigley Airport  is located near Wrigley, Northwest Territories, Canada.

References

External links

Registered aerodromes in the Dehcho Region